Chandra Kankanamage Kaluarachchi (April 6, 1943 – November 1, 2019), popularly known as Chandra Kaluarachchi, was an actress in Sri Lankan cinema, theater and television. Kaluarachchi is best known for performances in Welikathara (1971), Ira Madiyama (2003) and Nisala Gira (2007).

Personal life 
Chandra Kaluarachchi was born on 6 April 1943 and grew up in Narahenpita, near Colombo.

She died on 1 November 2019 at the age of 76. She was married to musician and actor Lakshman Wijesekara. They had one daughter: Ama and one son: Vihanga.

Career
In the meantime the program  named Lamapitiya  was encouraged to pursue acting in radio. After leaving college she played the leading role in several Sri Lankan stage productions such as Wahalak Neti Geyak produced by dramatist Premaranjit Tilakaratne. It got recognition at the State Drama Festival 1964, where she won the Best Actress Award. Chandra Kaluarachchi played a grandmother in the S. Karunaratne play Erabadu Mal Pottu Pipila in 1967. Dayananda Gunawardena's Gajaman Puwatha, first in the genre of "docudrama", which he introduced to the Sinhala stage on 14 October 1975. Since her debut role as a 19-year-old woman  in Raththaran putha by Arnold Wickramasuriya in 1962, Chandra was recognized for playing motherly and other figures on stage, film, radio and television serials.

Theatergraphy

Radiography

Filmography

References

External links 
Chandra Kaluarachchi's SLMDb
Reminiscing Chandra Kaluarachchi a robust talent to pursuit

1943 births
2019 deaths
20th-century Sri Lankan actresses
Radio actresses
Sinhalese actresses
Sri Lankan film actresses
Sri Lankan stage actresses
Sri Lankan television actresses